Kalmar County is a county or län in southern Sweden. It borders the counties of Kronoberg, Jönköping, Blekinge and Östergötland. To the east in the Baltic Sea is the island Gotland.

The counties are mainly administrative units. Geographically Kalmar County covers the eastern part in the Småland province, and the entire island of Öland.

Culture 
Much of Öland's present day landscape known as the Stora Alvaret has been designated as a World Heritage Site by UNESCO.  This southern part of Öland is known for a large number of rare species; early paleolithic settlement at Alby; other prehistoric remains such as the Gettlinge Gravefield and Eketorp Fortress; and the Ottenby Nature Preserve.

Administration 
Kalmar County was integrated with Kronoberg County until 1672. Blekinge was a part of Kalmar County between 1680 and 1683, due to the foundation of the naval base at Karlskrona.

The seat of residence for the Governor or Landshövding is Kalmar. The Governor is the head of the County Administrative Board or Länsstyrelse. The County Administrative Board is a Government Agency headed by a Governor. See List of Kalmar County Governors.

Since 1997 The municipalities and the county council cooperate through the indirectly politically controlled Regional Council of Kalmar County. The regional council represents the municipalities interests in regional growth issues, coordinates infrastructure planning, higher education, common cultural issues and administers various governmental an EU grants.

Governors

Riksdag elections 
The table details all Riksdag election results of Kalmar County since the unicameral era began in 1970. The blocs denote which party would support the Prime Minister or the lead opposition party towards the end of the elected parliament.

Municipalities 

On the mainland:

Emmaboda
Hultsfred
Högsby
Kalmar
Mönsterås
Nybro
Oskarshamn
Torsås
Vimmerby
Västervik

On Öland:

Borgholm
Mörbylånga

Localities in order of size 
The five most populous localities of Kalmar County in 2020:

Foreign background 
SCB have collected statistics on backgrounds of residents since 2002. These tables consist of all who have two foreign-born parents or are born abroad themselves. The chart lists election years and the last year on record alone.

Heraldry 

The County of Kalmar was formally granted its arms in 1944. Before this the county carried the arms of Småland and Öland side by side. The current arms is a combination of the arms for Småland and Öland. Blazon: "Quartered, the arms of Småland and Öland"

See also 
Linnaeus University
Arvid Jonsson

References and notes

External links 
Kalmar County Administrative Board
The Regional Council of Kalmar County
Kalmar County Council
University of Kalmar
Hotels in Kalmar

 

 
Counties of Sweden
Småland
Öland
States and territories established in 1634
1634 establishments in Sweden